is a Japanese novelist.

Biography 
The novelist Aiko Satō was born in Osaka in 1923. She is the second daughter of the novelist  and the agnate half-sister of the poet .

Satō graduated the Kōnan Higher Girls' School (the precursor to the modern ).

Works 
Satō published early works in the magazine Bungei Shuto (文芸首都). She wrote an autobiographical novel, Aiko (愛子, 1959), which she followed eight years later with a biography of her father entitled Hana wa Kurenai (花はくれない, "The Flowers Are Red", 1967) and seven years after that with a book about her mother, Joyū Mariko (女優万里子, "The Actress Mariko", 1974).

Her works Sokuratesu no Tsuma (ソクラテスの妻, "Socrates' Wife") and Futari no Onna (二人の女, "Two Women"), both published in 1963, earned a nomination for the Akutagawa Prize, and Kanō Taii Fujin (加納大尉婦人, published 1964) was nominated for the Naoki Prize. She won the 61st Naoki Prize for Tatakai-sunde Hi ga Kurete (闘いすんで日が暮れて), which portrays a woman's struggles with her incapable husband.

Notes

References

Citations

Works cited 

 
 

1923 births
Living people
Japanese women novelists
20th-century Japanese novelists
21st-century Japanese novelists
Naoki Prize winners
21st-century Japanese women writers
20th-century Japanese women writers